St. Anthony East is a neighborhood in the Northeast community in Minneapolis, Minnesota. Its boundaries are Broadway Street NE to the north, Central Avenue to the east and southeast, 2nd Avenue to the south, 5th Street NE to the southwest, and Washington Street to the west.

References

External links
Minneapolis Neighborhood Profile - St. Anthony East
St. Anthony East Neighborhood Association

Neighborhoods in Minneapolis